The weightlifting competitions at the 2021 Southeast Asian Games took place at Hanoi Sports Training and Competition Centre in Hanoi, Vietnam from 13 to 15 May 2022.

Participating nations

 (host)

Medal table

Medalists

Men

Women

References

External links
  

2021 Southeast Asian Games events
2021